Hyperoptic is a fibre-to-the-building Internet service provider (ISP) based in London, England.

History

Founded in 2011 by Boris Ivanovic (Chairman) and Dana Tobak (CEO & Managing Director), Hyperoptic works with freeholders and developers to offer fibre optic internet to buildings across the UK. Hyperoptic received a £50 million investment in May 2013 from Quantum Strategic Partners Ltd, a private investment vehicle managed by Soros Fund Management.

In July 2012, Hyperoptic received recognition from the Internet Service Providers' Association (ISPA) and awarded winner of the category of Best New ISP. In October 2012, Hyperoptic was awarded Best Urban Network Enterprise at the 2012 NextGen Challenge Awards. In January 2013 Hyperoptic was named Most Innovative Provider 2013 by Broadband Genie.

During 2013, Hyperoptic announced expansion plans to; Reading, Cardiff and Bristol. In July, Hyperoptic was named Best Superfast Broadband provider by the Internet Service Providers' Association (ISPA).

On May 28, 2014, it confirmed that services would be extending to Leeds, Liverpool, and Manchester and in October 2014, Hyperoptic announced it was to bring gigabit service to Glasgow, Newcastle, Sheffield, Birmingham and Nottingham.

On October 14, 2019, it was announced that investment firm KKR had bought a majority stake in Hyperoptic from funds managed by Newlight Partners LP and Mubadala Investment Company. As of July 2021 the company had passed over 600,000 homes, targeting 2 million by the end of 2022 and by October 2021, Hyperoptic announced it has deployed fibre in 57 towns and cities.

In January 2022, Hyperoptic contracted SharedVoice a digital campaign and public support company to build the Free to Switch campaign, calling on Ofcom to rule against above inflation mid-contract price rises on broadband. 

In April 2022, Hyperoptic reported they have now passed 825,000 homes and businesses, and also announced plans to pass an additional 400,000 by the end of 2022. They were awarded with the Gold Digital Inclusion award in the Choose Broadband Awards 2022 for their Fair Fibre social broadband tariffs.

References

External links 
 

Internet service providers of the United Kingdom
Telecommunications companies of the United Kingdom
Companies based in the London Borough of Hammersmith and Fulham